Jonas Eliel Löfgren (15 March 1872 in Öjebyn – 8 April 1940 in Stockholm) was a Swedish jurist and Liberal Party politician. He served as Minister of Justice from 1917 to 1920, and as Minister for Foreign Affairs from 1926 to 1928.

References 

1872 births
1940 deaths
People from Piteå
Liberal Party of Sweden politicians
20th-century Swedish lawyers
Swedish Ministers for Foreign Affairs
Swedish Ministers for Justice